Conjunctio is an extinct genus of dissorophid temnospondyl amphibian from the early Permian of New Mexico. The type species, Conjunctio multidens, was named by paleontologist Robert L. Carroll in 1964.

History of study 
The holotype specimen was found in 1911 in the Lower Permian Abo Formation in New Mexico. It consists of the skull and postcranial material including femora, humeri, scapulae, pelvis, a section of the vertebral column, and osteoderms. It was originally described by Case et al. (1913) as a referred specimen of Aspidosaurus (sometimes "Broiliellus") novomexicanus but was subsequently determined to be a distinct species by Carroll (1964). Carroll also identified a third specimen of Conjunctio, which he did not refer specifically to C. multidens; this was subsequently referred to as the "Admiral Taxon" (because it came from the Admiral Formation of Texas) by most workers until it was formalized as a distinct genus and species, Scapanops neglecta, by Schoch & Sues (2013). These authors also provided an updated description and illustration of C. multidens.

Phylogenetic position 
Conjunctio is typically recovered as a basal eucacopine.

References

Dissorophids
Cisuralian temnospondyls of North America
Permian geology of New Mexico
Fossil taxa described in 1964
Prehistoric amphibian genera
Taxa named by Robert L. Carroll